The Anti-Detective is a 1920 German silent film directed by Harry Berber and starring Reinhold Schünzel.

Cast
In alphabetical order

References

Bibliography

External links

1920 films
Films of the Weimar Republic
German silent short films
German black-and-white films